Motebennur is one of the largest villages in Haveri district of the state of Karnataka, India. It is the largest village in Byadagi Taluk. It is about 10 km south from Haveri city in NH-4. Local language is Kannada, 

Villages in Haveri district

This is located at center of the Haveri district and have a good transport system of both road way and rail way. One of the largest road transport system in india NH4 passes through this village.

This village have given birth to one of the popular freedom fighters "Mahadev Mailar" who took part in "Uppina Satyagraha". Motebennur also have a historic school called "GOVT HIGHER PRIMARY KANNADA GIRLS SCHOOL" which is inaugurated on 1906. Motebennur also have few other good education institutions like "Navodaya Vidhya Samsthe", "Ballari Rudrappa Education Society", "Govt Higher Primary Kannada Boys School".

Govt boys school also have over 100 year history.

Motebennur have given birth to a famous poetry "Mahadev Banakar". This village also have a historic Church called "C.S.I.Shanti Church" built by British before independence.